Donald J. Walchuk (born March 6, 1963 in Melville, Saskatchewan) is a Canadian curler from Edmonton, Alberta. For many years Walchuk played third for Kevin Martin's team. On Martin's rink, Walchuk was known especially for his "high heat" - his big-weight takeout shots.

Curling career 
Walchuk played for Pat Ryan as his lead (1985–1986) and his second (1987–1989). With Ryan, Walchuk won four provincial championships, two Briers (1988, 1989) and a World Championship (1989).

After playing with Ryan, he played for Randy Ferbey in 1990 as his third, then skipped his own team from 1992 to 1994.

Walchuk joined Kevin Martin's team as third prior to the 1996 season. With Martin, he won the Brier in 1997, an Olympic silver medal in 2002, Canada Cup's in 2005 and 2006 and four Alberta provincial championships.

On May 7, 2008, Walchuk officially joined Team Kerry Burtnyk. Burtnyk, a  two time Brier winner and gold and bronze medal winner at the world championships, recruited Walchuk as third to replace Dan Kammerlock. The foursome was rounded out by Richard Daneault (second) and Garth Smith (lead).

In 2010, Walchuk left the Burtnyk rink to form his own team with Chris Schille, D. J. Kidby and Don Bartlett.

Personal life 
Walchuk is an investment advisor for Raymond James Ltd.
He is married to Laurie Latter Walchuk. Together they have four children.

References

External links
 

Curlers from Saskatchewan
Curlers from Alberta
Curlers from Manitoba
Curlers at the 2002 Winter Olympics
Olympic silver medalists for Canada
Living people
1963 births
World curling champions
Sportspeople from Melville, Saskatchewan
Brier champions
Olympic medalists in curling
Medalists at the 2002 Winter Olympics
Canadian male curlers
Continental Cup of Curling participants
Canada Cup (curling) participants